Eisha Singh (born 24 December 1998) is an Indian actress who predominantly works in Hindi television. She began her acting career in 2015 with Colors TV's soap Ishq Ka Rang Safed where she portrayed a widow Dhaani Awasthi. Singh is best known for portraying Zara Siddiqui in Zee TV's popular romantic Ishq Subhan Allah. She was last seen portraying Suhani Ranveer Oberoi in Colors TV's dramatic Sirf Tum (2021-22).

Early life
Singh was born on 24 December 1998 in Bhopal, Madhya Pradesh, India.

Career
At the age of 17, Singh made her television debut in 2015 as Dhaani Tripathi (née Awasthi), a widow with whom an unmarried boy falls in love in Ishq Ka Rang Safed opposite Mishal Raheja. Unable to play a mother after a 5 year-leap was introduced, she quit in May 2016 and was replaced by Sanjeeda Sheikh.

From 2016 to 2017, Singh starred opposite Sartaj Gill in Ek Tha Raja Ek Thi Rani. She played three characters: Raani Singh, a princess; then Rani Chauhan, Raani's reincarnated version; and lastly Naina, Rani's lookalike.

In 2018, Singh portrayed, Zara Siddiqui, in the social drama Ishq Subhan Allah opposite Adnan Khan. The show ended in 2020. The show dealt with the sensitive and burning issue of Triple Talaq.

In 2020, she played Preet in an episode of Pyaar Tune Kya Kiya. In 2021, she appeared in the music video "Main Tera Ho Gaya". From 2021 to 2022, Singh has been portraying the role of Suhani, on Colors TV's romantic drama Sirf Tum.

Singh will make her Hindi film debut with Ratnaa Sinha's next alongside Prit Kamani.

Filmography

Films

Television

Special appearances

Music videos

References

External links 

 
 

1998 births
Living people
Actresses from Bhopal
Indian film actresses
Indian television actresses
Actresses in Hindi television
Actresses in Hindi cinema
21st-century Indian actresses